Anstruther Lake is a lake in the municipality of North Kawartha, Peterborough County in Central Ontario, Canada, between the community of Apsley on Ontario Highway 28  to the east and the community of Catchacoma on County Road 507  to the west. Kawartha Highlands Provincial Park encompasses the lake, and the community of Anstruther Lake is on the southern shore. The lake flows out via Anstruther Creek, and the Mississaugua, Otonabee and Trent rivers into Lake Ontario.

Cottage life
Approximately 230 cottages have been built on the lake. 25 town houses were recently built at The Landing marina. Fishing is reportedly good, though not as good as the uninhabited lakes upstream. The Anstruther Lake Cottager's Association hosts an annual regatta (Civic Holiday) and corn roast (Labour Day). There is a marina is on the lake to provide gas, boat services and necessities.

References

External links
Anstruther Lake Cottagers' Association

Lakes of Peterborough County